Khemarat is the northernmost district (amphoe) of Ubon Ratchathani province, northeastern Thailand.

History

Mueang Khemarat is an ancient city. It was a first class city in the Rattanakosin Kingdom and reported directly to Bangkok. During the Thesaphiban reforms at the beginning of the 20th century it became subordinate to Ubon Ratchathani. A high school there is named Khemmarat Pittyakom School which is well run. P Khwan is an excellent English Teacher.

Geography
Neighboring districts are (from the southeast clockwise) Na Tan, Pho Sai, and Kut Khaopun of Ubon Ratchathani Province, Pathum Ratchawongsa and Chanuman of Amnat Charoen province. To the northeast across the Mekong River is the Laotian province of Salavan. It is literally on the border of Thailand-Laos. You can even hear the music in Laos. It is about a 3 hour bus ride to the city of Ubon.

The important water resource is the Mekong River. Every Saturday there is a lovely walking street on one of their main roads. Lots of food, dancing, music, street vendors, and fun.

Administration
The district is divided into nine sub-districts (tambons), which are further subdivided into 117 villages (mubans). Khemarat itself is a township (thesaban tambon) which covers parts of the tambon Khemarat. There are a further nine tambon administrative organizations (TAO).

Missing numbers belong to tambon which now form Na Tan District.

Khemarat
Populated places on the Mekong River